Instinct (French: L'instinct) is a 1930 French drama film directed by André Liabel and Léon Mathot and starring Léon Mathot, Madeleine Carroll and André Marnay.

Cast
 Léon Mathot 
 Madeleine Carroll 
 André Marnay 
 Irène Brillant 
 Gil Roland

References

Bibliography
 James Monaco. The Encyclopedia of Film. Perigee Books, 1991.

External links

1930 films
1930 drama films
French drama films
Films directed by Léon Mathot
French silent feature films
French films based on plays
French black-and-white films
Silent drama films
1930s French films
1930s French-language films